Gennady Malianov is a fictional detective from a cycle of science fiction / techno thriller stories by Canadian writer Karl Schroeder set in the near future. Typically Malianov operates as a freelance nuclear arms inspector investigating various cases of threats related to radioactive materials.

Overview
Malianov is a "pathologically shy Ukrainian arms inspector and anti-James Bond",  "neither dashing nor brave, not a killer, manipulator or even particularly clever". Within the context of technological progress, he is neither optimist, nor apocalypic pessimist. Regardless rises and falls in the world, Malianov works hard to clean up the mess, thus working towards the progress. As Schroeder puts it: "Shooting radioactive camels in the Gobi desert is one of the prices to be paid for our industrialist past, and somebody has to pay it. Gennady represents that side of technological progress that we in SF so rarely acknowledge: he's a trash collector," "a world's janitor". 

Malianov is a favorite of the writer. In 2019 Schroeder tweeted that he was hoping to collect all Malianov stories in one book.

Stories
 "The Dragon of Pripyat", 1999 
Tesseracts 8 anthology, Tesseract Books, 1999.) 

Malianov enters the Chernobyl exclusion zone to investigate an extortionist's threat to breach the nuclear containment "sarcophagus" and dump the radioactive waste into the Pripyat River. Also there are rumors about a dragon in the area.

 "Alexander's Road", 2005
The Engine of Recall 

Malianov's search of missing stolen uranium leads him to a search of two stolen Soviet nuclear bombs, hidden under abandoned oil derricks in Azerbaijan.
Nominated for the Aurora Award for Best Short Fiction in 2006. 

 "To Hie from Far Cilenia", 2008
METAtropolis: The Dawn of Uncivilization

Malianov is tracking some stolen plutonium to be smuggled, and finds that the illegal deals are carried out in virtual states. The story is set in near future, with advanced developments in the area of virtual reality and information networking.

 "Deodand", 2010
Originally published in METAtropolis: Cascadia

In the story, a deodand is an artificial intelligence that represents some system of the nature: a lake, a pack of wolves, etc. As such, the deodands try to optimize the interests of the systems they represent.  Malianov runs into them during a temporary gig after the events from the Cilenia story: a robotics company hires him to figure out why their AI misbehave.

 "Laika's Ghost", 2010 
Engineering Infinity, edited by Jonathan Strahan, December 2010

Paul Kincaid in his review of the 2012 "Best of the Year" anthologies called it one of the best stories in the reviewed collections. He sees it as a reflection of the growing pessimism in science fiction: [Malianov] "discovers that the only people ready to take up the dream of flight to other worlds are aged remnants of the former Soviet Union". Schroeder disagrees with Kincaid's judgement: in the broader context of Malianov stories, the world is not exhausted in its energy, it merely shifts the gears.

The title alludes to Laika, a Soviet space dog.

 "Kheldyu", 2014 
Reach for Infinity, edited by Jonathan Strahan, May 2014

An Achille Marceau builds solar updraft towers in Siberia, which generate electricity while taking CO2 out of the air, thus supposedly helping to combat the global warming while profiting from the market in carbon. However, Malianov notices an environmental disaster in the area. With the help of an ally, who is Achille's sister and UN's arms inspector, the sinister design is thwarted in an action-packed story.

Shroeder describes "Kheldyu" as "my most pessimistic Gennady Malianov piece".

Notes

References

External links

Laika's Ghost, a reprint in Clarkesworld

Fictional private investigators
Science fiction characters
Nuclear safety and security
Fictional Ukrainian people